Is This Goodbye, Charlie Brown? is the 24th prime-time animated television special based upon the comic strip Peanuts, by Charles M. Schulz. It was originally aired on the CBS network on February 21, 1983. In the special, Charlie Brown tries to cope with learning that Linus and Lucy are moving away.

Plot
This special begins when Linus calls the Brown house, and Sally picks up. She gets very excited that her Sweet Babboo is on the other line. He declines that he is that, and tries to ask if Charlie Brown is home, but while he is doing so, she asks if he called to ask her to a movie. He gets furious, and yells at her, saying, he won't be taking her to a movie, and wants to talk to her brother. She misinterprets that, and tells him she will be waiting outside for him to pick her up. She gives the phone to Charlie Brown.

Linus tells Charlie Brown he has something important to tell him and that he will be over right away. When he arrives, he tells Charlie Brown they will have to move, due to his father's job transfer. He is shocked to hear this.

Lucy then goes to Schroeder to tell him the same thing Linus told Charlie Brown, and gives him a picture of her so he will always remember her. He says "But what if I want to forget you, and turn it around?" She does this, and Schroeder panics that it is double-sided.

Charlie Brown then sadly watches the "Sam's Moving" movers take the Van Pelts' things, and load it into their trucks. He then goes to Lucy's psychiatry booth, and tells her he will be miserable without Linus. She yells at him, and reminds him that she is also leaving. She shows him the booth's new owner Snoopy, who has changed its cost on the sign from 5 cents to 50 cents (presumably more than Charlie Brown's allowance).  Linus tells  Charlie Brown that he is playing his last baseball game with him later on.

Lucy then walks over to the Brown house, and finds Sally waiting out in front, saying she is waiting for Linus to take her to the movie. Lucy tells her that they are moving, so he won't pick her up, but she doesn't believe this.

Linus then invites Charlie Brown to his and Lucy's going away party. He asks Sally if she wants to come, but she insists that Linus is going to pick her up and take her to a movie. The van Pelts' going away party is catered by Snoopy, who feeds everyone dog biscuits, and dog food with water causing everyone  to leave disgusted.

The next day, Linus and Lucy say their sad goodbyes to Charlie Brown. As they are pulling out, Linus throws Snoopy his security blanket, as a way to remember him. After the van Pelts leave, Charlie Brown sadly walks home. When Charlie Brown gets home, Sally is sitting on the porch, still waiting for Linus to take her to a movie. Charlie Brown tells her that he and his family moved away. She angrily walks inside. Then, Schroeder comes by to ask where Lucy is, and Charlie Brown tells him that she and her family moved away. He says that he thought she was kidding, then grows upset and says, "I never got to say goodbye." In a later scene, Schroeder is playing the piano with the musical staff above him, and her head appears between the treble and bass staff. When he notices, he stops playing and says to the camera: "Don't tell me I've grown accustomed to that face."

The next day, Charlie Brown tells Peppermint Patty, that he is upset over Linus' moving away. She tells Marcie that they have to help him get over his sadness. Marcie asks her if she likes him, and she naturally declines it. She walks home trying to convince herself that she couldn't like a loser like him.

That night while Patty is trying to sleep, she thinks Charlie Brown is probably feeling bad for himself, and decides to call him to make him feel better. When she calls him, Charlie Brown is so tired that he doesn't seem to be listening to what Peppermint Patty is saying. She invites him on a date to the movies, but makes it seem as if Charlie Brown is asking her instead. She says she would go with him to a movie, then hangs up, and goes to sleep feeling good about herself. Charlie Brown then suddenly wakes up and wonders what he was doing by the phone, thinking he just dreamt he was talking to Peppermint Patty.

The next day, Peppermint Patty is waiting for Charlie Brown to pick her up for their date. Marcie goes to him at the wall, and asks why he looks so tired. He tells her that for some strange reason, he woke up at midnight by the phone, after dreaming he spoke to Peppermint Patty. She realizes what is happening, and tells Peppermint Patty that he's not coming. She doesn't  believe her and continues to wait.

Later that day, Peppermint Patty calls Charlie Brown because she is angry that he didn't show up for their date. She continues to bother him, but says she won't take revenge on him, and when they hang up, he says, "I never know what's going on." Sally expects a phone call from Linus, and Charlie Brown reminds her that Linus moved, and that even if he was still here, he wouldn't be calling her. Charlie Brown then shows her a postcard from him which only reads about her: "Have you seen any good movies lately?"

Charlie Brown notices moving trucks in front of the van Pelt house again. He looks to see what is going on, and he is excited to find Linus. He tells him his father didn't like his new job and they are moving back. Just then, Lucy gets out of the car and says, "What kind of a neighborhood is this? It didn't change a bit while we were gone," to which Linus says, "Oh yeah. She's back too," before Snoopy throws Linus his security blanket back ending the film.

Voice actors
 Brad Kesten as Charlie Brown
 Jeremy Schoenberg as Linus van Pelt
 Angela Lee Sloan as Lucy van Pelt
 Stacy Heather Tolkin as Sally Brown
 Bill Melendez as Snoopy and Woodstock
 Kevin Brando as Schroeder, Franklin
 Victoria Vargas as Peppermint Patty
 Michael Dockery as Marcie
Patty, Roy, Pig-Pen, Violet, and Shermy have silent roles.

Home media
The special was released on VHS by Hi-Tops Video in 1987 and Paramount Home Video on June 25, 1996. It was released for the first time on DVD alongside Charlie Brown's Christmas Tales as a CVS Pharmacy Exclusive offer on November 3, 2009 and then solicited to the wider market in 2010. It was re-released as part of the box set Snoopy's Holiday Collection on October 1, 2013.

References

External links
 

Peanuts television specials
Television shows directed by Phil Roman
1980s American television specials
1980s animated television specials
1983 television specials
1983 in American television
CBS television specials
Television shows written by Charles M. Schulz